Samuel Parker (August 17, 1744 – December 6, 1804) was an American Episcopal Bishop. He was the second bishop of the Episcopal Diocese of Massachusetts.

Education and Ordination
Parker was born in Portsmouth, New Hampshire, the son of William Parker, a lawyer and judge during the American Revolution. He graduated from Harvard University in 1764, and taught for several years.

After being offered a job as assistant rector of Trinity Church, Boston, Parker was ordained deacon on February 24, 1774 and priest three days later on February 27, in London. He began as assistant rector at Trinity in November 1774, becoming rector in 1779. After the Revolution, he helped build churches with the Society for the Propagation of the Gospel.

In 1803, Parker was unanimously elected second bishop of Massachusetts. He was consecrated September 14, 1804, in Trinity Church, New York, but developed gout and never served in the post. He died in Boston on December 6, 1804.

Consecrators
William White, 1st bishop of Pennsylvania and 1st and 4th Presiding Bishop
Thomas John Claggett, 1st bishop of Maryland
Abraham Jarvis, 2nd bishop of Connecticut
Parker was the tenth bishop consecrated in the Episcopal Church.

Publications
 Annual Election Sermon before the Legislature of Massachusetts (1793)
 Sermon for the Benefit of the Boston Female Asylum (1803)

Family life
Parker's sons included Suffolk County district attorney Samuel Dunn Parker, acting Mayor of Boston William Parker, businessman John Rowe Parker, and educator Richard Green Parker.

References

Further reading
Sprague, William Buell.:   Annals of the American Pulpit: Or, Commemorative Notices of Distinguished American Clergymen of Various Denominations, from the Early Settlement of the Country to the Close of the Year Eighteen Hundred and Fifty-five Pages 296–298, (1859).
 The Episcopal Church Annual. Morehouse Publishing: New York, NY (2005).
 

 

1744 births
1804 deaths
Harvard University alumni
People from Portsmouth, New Hampshire
People from Massachusetts
Episcopal bishops of Massachusetts
19th-century Anglican bishops in the United States
People of colonial New Hampshire
18th-century American clergy

18th-century Anglican theologians
19th-century Anglican theologians